The 1974–75 Tercera División season is the 41st since its establishment.

League tables

Group I

Group II

Group III

Group IV

Promotion playoff

Relegation playoff

Tiebreakers

Season records
 Most wins: 28, Osasuna.
 Most draws: 16, Torrejón.
 Most losses: 28, Unión Club.
 Most goals for: 79, Osasuna.
 Most goals against: 97, Unión Club.
 Most points: 61, Osasuna.
 Fewest wins: 5, Caudal and Unión Club.
 Fewest draws: 3, Tortosa.
 Fewest losses: 5, Osasuna.
 Fewest goals for: 26, Real Granada.
 Fewest goals against: 25, Deportivo de La Coruña.
 Fewest points: 15, Unión Club.

External links
RSSSF 
Futbolme 

Tercera División seasons
3
Spain